Karl Viktorovich Pauker  (January 1893, in Lviv – 14 August 1937, in Moscow) was an NKVD officer and head of Joseph Stalin's personal security until his arrest and execution.

Pauker was born into Jewish family in Lviv, which was then part of Austria-Hungary. Prior to the war he was a hairdresser working in the Budapest Opera, according to Simon Sebag Montefiore. He served in the Austro-Hungarian army in World War I and was taken as a prisoner of war by the Russians in 1916. Pauker elected to stay in Russia after the revolution and joined the Communist Party in 1918.

Pauker joined the Cheka and became Stalin's bodyguard in 1924. Pauker took an active part in the purges, including the executions of Grigory Zinoviev and Lev Kamenev.

He was dismissed in April 1937, according to Simon Sebag Montefiore, because he "knew too much and lived too well". He was arrested and executed quietly without trial in August 1937 and was not posthumously rehabilitated.

External links
Simon Sebag Montefiore, 2004, Stalin, the Court of the Red Tsar. 
page in Russian language

1893 births
1937 deaths
People from Lviv
People from the Kingdom of Galicia and Lodomeria
Ukrainian Jews
Soviet Jews
Bolsheviks
Austro-Hungarian prisoners of war in World War I
World War I prisoners of war held by Russia
Austro-Hungarian emigrants to the Russian Empire
Commissars 2nd Class of State Security
Great Purge victims from Ukraine
Communist Party of the Soviet Union members
Jews executed by the Soviet Union
Jewish socialists
Deaths by firearm in the Soviet Union
Cheka